CD-51 was a C Type class escort ship (Kaibōkan) of the Imperial Japanese Navy during the Second World War.

History
CD-51 was laid down by the Mitsubishi Heavy Industries at their Kobe Shipyard on 1 May 1944, launched on 20 August 1944, and completed and commissioned on 21 September 1944. During the war CD-51 was mostly busy on escort duties.

CD-51 was struck from the Navy List on 10 March 1945.

References

Additional sources

1944 ships
Ships built by Mitsubishi Heavy Industries
Type C escort ships
Maritime incidents in January 1945
World War II shipwrecks in the Sea of Japan
Ships sunk by US aircraft